Novinka is a rural locality (a selo) in Kalininsky Selsoviet of Volodarsky District, Astrakhan Oblast, Russia. The population was 1,045 as of 2010. There are 10 streets.

Geography 
Novinka is located on the Kamardan River, 18 km south of Volodarsky (the district's administrative centre) by road. Kamardan is the nearest rural locality.

References 

Rural localities in Volodarsky District, Astrakhan Oblast